Renata Voráčová was the defending champion, but chose not to participate.

Dia Evtimova won the title by defeating Anastasia Pivovarova in the final 6–2, 6–2.

Seeds

Main draw

Finals

Top half

Bottom half

References 
 Main draw
 Qualifying draw

2011 ITF Women's Circuit
2011 in Croatian tennis
Women's tennis in Croatia
Zagreb Ladies Open